Phryneta atricornis is a species of beetle in the family Cerambycidae. It was described by Léon Fairmaire in 1893. It is known from Comoros.

References

Phrynetini
Beetles described in 1893